Amtali is a town in Tripura .  It is 10 km away from Agartala in West Tripura district of Tripura state.  There is one post-office in the Amtali Bazar (market place) and one Police station also.  It is approximately 2 km away from the Tripura University.  This town is located in Dukli Rural Development Block.

References 

Cities and towns in West Tripura district

bpy:আমতলী